Popillia is a genus of scarab beetles. The most familiar species is the Japanese beetle (P. japonica) which is responsible for crop losses around the world, and is near the top of the insect pest lists year after year.

Species

 Popillia acuta
 Popillia adamas
 Popillia aenea
 Popillia aeneipennis
 Popillia aenescens
 Popillia albertina
 Popillia amabilis
 Popillia amitina
 Popillia andamanica
 Popillia angeli
 Popillia angolana
 Popillia angulicollis
 Popillia anomaloides
 Popillia anthracina
 Popillia ardoini
 Popillia atra
 Popillia atrocoerulea
 Popillia aurora
 Popillia avita
 Popillia baliana
 Popillia barbellata
 Popillia barrei
 Popillia basilewskyi
 Popillia baugneei
 Popillia beniana
 Popillia benitensis
 Popillia bennigseni
 Popillia bhutanensis
 Popillia bhutanica
 Popillia biguttata
 Popillia biimpressa
 Popillia bipunctata
 Popillia birmanica
 Popillia bisignata
 Popillia bitacta
 Popillia bogdanovi
 Popillia bouyeri
 Popillia brancucci
 Popillia browni
 Popillia bruersi
 Popillia brunnicollis
 Popillia burgeoni
 Popillia callewaerti
 Popillia callipyga
 Popillia cameruna
 Popillia camiadei
 Popillia candezei
 Popillia cerchnopyga
 Popillia cerinimaculata
 Popillia chalcocnemis
 Popillia chalcocnemisoides
 Popillia chinensis
 Popillia chirindana
 Popillia chlorion
 Popillia clypealis
 Popillia coerulea
 Popillia comma
 Popillia complanata
 Popillia congrex
 Popillia constanti
 Popillia constantioides
 Popillia cornelli
 Popillia costalis
 Popillia costipennis
 Popillia crassiuscula
 Popillia crenatipennis
 Popillia cribricollis
 Popillia cuprascens
 Popillia cupricollis
 Popillia cupripes
 Popillia curtipennis
 Popillia cyanea
 Popillia dajaka
 Popillia daliensis
 Popillia decellei
 Popillia decoenei
 Popillia demeyeri
 Popillia deplanata
 Popillia desfontainei
 Popillia desprogesi
 Popillia dichroa
 Popillia difficilis
 Popillia digennaroi
 Popillia dilutipennis
 Popillia discalis
 Popillia discissa
 Popillia distigma
 Popillia distinguenda
 Popillia dives
 Popillia djallonensis
 Popillia donckieri
 Popillia dorsigera
 Popillia dorsofasciata
 Popillia drumonti
 Popillia ducatrix
 Popillia eduardina
 Popillia ertli
 Popillia erythropus
 Popillia eximia
 Popillia expalescens
 Popillia faida
 Popillia fallaciosa
 Popillia felix
 Popillia felschei
 Popillia femoralis
 Popillia feroni
 Popillia fimbripes
 Popillia flavitarsis
 Popillia flavofasciata
 Popillia flavosellata
 Popillia flavotrabeata
 Popillia flexuosa
 Popillia foveicollis
 Popillia fukiensis
 Popillia gabonensis
 Popillia gedongensis
 Popillia gemma
 Popillia gerialis
 Popillia ghanaensis
 Popillia ghesquierei
 Popillia graminea
 Popillia graueri
 Popillia hainanensis
 Popillia hassoni
 Popillia hexaspila
 Popillia hilaris
 Popillia hirta
 Popillia hirtiventris
 Popillia hirtypyga
 Popillia histeroidea
 Popillia hymenalis
 Popillia hypselotropis
 Popillia imitans
 Popillia impressipyga
 Popillia insularis
 Popillia intermedia
 Popillia interpunctata
 Popillia isabellae
 Popillia iwasei
 Popillia jadoti
 Popillia japonica
 Popillia jolyi
 Popillia kanarensis
 Popillia kerkhofi
 Popillia kiwuana
 Popillia kolbei
 Popillia kolleri
 Popillia kraatzi
 Popillia laetans
 Popillia laevicollis
 Popillia laevis
 Popillia laeviscutula
 Popillia laevistriata
 Popillia lasiopyga
 Popillia latecostata
 Popillia latimaculata
 Popillia legalli
 Popillia leleupi
 Popillia lemoulti
 Popillia leonardi
 Popillia leptotarsa
 Popillia lerui
 Popillia lewisi
 Popillia ligulata
 Popillia limbatipennis
 Popillia lineata
 Popillia linpingi
 Popillia liturata
 Popillia livida
 Popillia longula
 Popillia lucida
 Popillia luteipennis
 Popillia macgregori
 Popillia maclellandi
 Popillia macularia
 Popillia mairessi
 Popillia manni
 Popillia marginicollis
 Popillia matertera
 Popillia maynei
 Popillia medleri
 Popillia meinhardti
 Popillia melanochlora
 Popillia melanoloma
 Popillia membranifera
 Popillia merkli
 Popillia migliaccioi
 Popillia miniatipennis
 Popillia minuta
 Popillia mokana
 Popillia molirensis
 Popillia mongolica
 Popillia morettoi
 Popillia mpalainensis
 Popillia muelleri
 Popillia mutabilis
 Popillia mutans
 Popillia nagaii
 Popillia nasuta
 Popillia nathani
 Popillia niijimae
 Popillia nitida
 Popillia njamensis
 Popillia nottrotti
 Popillia nubeculosa
 Popillia nyassica
 Popillia obliterata
 Popillia octogona
 Popillia ohausi
 Popillia opaca
 Popillia ovata
 Popillia oviformis
 Popillia oxypyga
 Popillia pachycnema
 Popillia parvula
 Popillia patkiana
 Popillia patricia
 Popillia petrarcai
 Popillia piattellai
 Popillia pilicollis
 Popillia pilicrus
 Popillia pilosa
 Popillia plagiata
 Popillia plagicollis
 Popillia planiuscula
 Popillia plifera
 Popillia princeps
 Popillia proneptis
 Popillia propinqua
 Popillia psilopyga
 Popillia pui
 Popillia pulchra
 Popillia pulchripes
 Popillia puncticollis
 Popillia pustulata
 Popillia quadriguttata
 Popillia quelpartiana
 Popillia revirescens
 Popillia ricchiardii
 Popillia richteri
 Popillia robichei
 Popillia rothschildti
 Popillia rotundata
 Popillia ruandana
 Popillia rubescens
 Popillia rubripes
 Popillia rubromaculata
 Popillia rufipes
 Popillia runsorica
 Popillia sabatinelli
 Popillia sandyx
 Popillia sankuruensis
 Popillia sanmenensis
 Popillia sauteri
 Popillia sauvageae
 Popillia scabricollis
 Popillia schenkeli
 Popillia schiltzi
 Popillia schizonycha
 Popillia schultzei
 Popillia scutellata
 Popillia sebastiani
 Popillia semiaenea
 Popillia semicuprea
 Popillia sequax
 Popillia serena
 Popillia seydeli
 Popillia sichuanensis
 Popillia signifera
 Popillia sikkimensis
 Popillia simlana
 Popillia smaragdina
 Popillia soror
 Popillia soulai
 Popillia spinipennis
 Popillia spinosa
 Popillia spoliata
 Popillia strigicollis
 Popillia strumifera
 Popillia subquadrata
 Popillia sulcata
 Popillia sulcipennis
 Popillia sumatrensis
 Popillia suturalis
 Popillia symmetrica
 Popillia taiwana
 Popillia tandallae
 Popillia testaceipennis
 Popillia timoriensis
 Popillia transversa
 Popillia trichiopyga
 Popillia trichocnemis
 Popillia tricholopha
 Popillia tristicula
 Popillia tullia
 Popillia uchidai
 Popillia ugandana
 Popillia uhligi
 Popillia ukambana
 Popillia unguicularis
 Popillia usanguana
 Popillia variabilis
 Popillia varicollis
 Popillia varicolor
 Popillia vastipes
 Popillia werneri
 Popillia versicolorea
 Popillia vignai
 Popillia vingerhoedti
 Popillia violaceipennis
 Popillia viridiaurata
 Popillia viridicyanea
 Popillia viridipes
 Popillia viridula
 Popillia viskensi
 Popillia wittmeri
 Popillia yacouba
 Popillia zerchei

References
 List of Asian Popillia as of 2002-12-29.
 Bisby F.A., Roskov Y.R., Orrell T.M., Nicolson D., Paglinawan L.E., Bailly N., Kirk P.M., Bourgoin T., Baillargeon G., Ouvrard D. (red.) (2011).  - Species 2000 & ITIS Catalogue of Life: Annual Checklist
 Sabatinelli, Guido. (1993). Studi morfologici i e sistematici sul genere Popillia: Le specie Indo-Himalayane con disco del pronoto pubescente (Coleoptera, Scarabaeoidea, Rutelidae) Fragm. Entomol., Roma, 24 (2): 201-214 (1993)
 Lin P. 1980. New species of genus Popillia from China (Coleoptera, Rutelidae). — Acta zootaxon. sin. 5: 192—199.
 Lin P. 1987. Three new species ol Popillia from the himalayan region. — Entomotaxonomia. 9: 195—200.
 Lin P. 1988. The Popillia of China (Coleoptera, Rutelidae). Ilustritaj Cinaj Insect — Faunoj: 1. Tianze Eldonejo, 71 pp., 25 taw.

Scarabaeidae genera
Rutelinae